Georgy Vladimirovich Cherdantsev (February 1, 1971, Moscow, USSR) is a Russian sports commentator, TV and radio. Got mainly known as a sports commentator channels NTV and NTV Plus. He is currently working on the channel Match TV.

Biography 
Georgy Cherdantsev born February 1, 1971, in Moscow. Great-grandfather George wrote the first textbook on Russian shorthand. His great-grandfather was the first geographical map of Uzbekistan. Once one of the streets of Tashkent was Cherdantsev's named.

Since 1982 to 1989 he played in Moscow football championship among the clubs of Spartak-2, but was forced to finish his football career due to a knee injury. He graduated from the Department of Romance and Germanic Philology Faculty of Moscow State University in 1992, qualifyiung as a translator and English teacher. He speaks also Italian. After graduation he worked in the legal department in a bank, a loader in a warehouse in Istanbul, in the tourist company.

Television
Beginning in 1996 Georgy was employed by NTV Plus television channel. He started in the position of interpreter, then began to report small stories, reports, football championships reviews. He was a correspondent for the program  Football Club of Vasily Utkin. As a reporter for preparing reports for the issues under the title  football club in the World Cup 1998. Commented first football game dates back to 1998, a record broadcast World Cup games in France between the national teams of Italy and Norway.

Since 2004 to 2007 he worked as a press attaché of the Russian Premier League.

In August 2013 he was appointed head of the TV channel  Sport Plus. On Sport Plus in 2014 he presented the  Olympic Channel   from Sochi in tandem with the leading radio  Sport   FM  Sofya Tartakova, where at that time was a presenter.

He has mainly commentated on matches in Serie A. Also he worked as a commentator for the World and European championships. Commentated for three UEFA Champions League — in 2003, 2007 and 2015.

In April 2015 AST publishing house published a book of Cherdantsev Notes of Football Commentator.

Since 2015 —  columnist Russian version of EA Sports FIFA 16  (together with Konstantin Genich).

References

External links
 Official website
 Георгий Черданцев: «Вокруг все больше мин. Разговор о футболе стал игрой в сапера»
 Черданцев комментирует «Матч всех звёзд» — анонс конкурса «Ты комментатор»

1971 births
Living people
Sports commentators
Russian sports journalists
Russian association football commentators
Moscow State University alumni
Russian radio personalities